Chapaev Peak, also romanized as Chapayev Peak, is a 6371m mountain in the Tian Shan. It is located in the Issyk-Kul Region in east Kyrgyzstan.

It is separated from Khan Tengri by a 3.28 km ridge.

History
It is named for the Russian soldier and Red Army commander Vasily Chapaev and was first climbed in 1937 by I. Tjutjunnikow.

References

Mountains of Kyrgyzstan
Six-thousanders of the Tian Shan
Issyk-Kul Region